Ain Dorij is a town in Ouezzane Province, Tanger-Tetouan-Al Hoceima, Morocco. According to the 2004 census it has a population of 2,321.

References

Populated places in Ouezzane Province